Leptohyphodes is a genus of little stout crawler mayflies in the family Leptohyphidae. There is one described species in Leptohyphodes, L. inanis.

References

Further reading

 
 

Mayflies
Articles created by Qbugbot